Frenchman Creek, Frenchman's Creek, or Frenchmans Creek may refer to:

Frenchman Creek (Missouri), a stream in Missouri
 Frenchman's Creek, one of seven creeks on the Helford River, Cornwall.
Frenchman Creek (Republican River), a stream in Colorado and Nebraska
Frenchmans Creek (California), a river in the United States of America
Frenchmans Creek (New South Wales), a river in Australia
Battle of Frenchman's Creek, battle in the War of 1812
Frenchman's Creek (novel), 1942 historical novel by Daphne du Maurier
Frenchman's Creek (film), 1944 film adaptation of the novel
Frenchman's Creek Beach and Country Club, a country club in Florida